Ghanem (also Romanized as Ghānem; also known as Boneh-ye Qā’em, Boneh-ye Qānem, Bonneh-ye Ghānem Morīshed, and Sūfān) is a village in Shahid Modarres Rural District, in the Central District of Shushtar County, Khuzestan Province, Iran. At the 2006 census, its population was 511, in 100 families.

References 

Populated places in Shushtar County